Muanpiällinen helevetti ("Hell on Earth") is the debut album by the Finnish melodic death metal band Verjnuarmu.

Track listing

 "Kurjuuvven valssi" ("Waltz of Misery") - 2:57
 "Vihankylyväjä" ("Hate-Sower") - 3:51
 "Noetavaeno" ("Witch-Hunt") - 3:38
 "Jäläkeläenen" ("Descendant") - 3:34
 "Tuljmyrskyt" ("Firestorms") - 4:01
 "Itkuvirsj'" ("Dirge") - 3:13
 "Kuuvven sylen syvvyyvessä" ("Six Fathom Deep") - 4:24
 "Kalaman kalapee" ("Deathly Pale") - 2:30
 "Laalavat jouset" ("Singing Bows") - 5:02 
 "Kärähtäny kylä" ("Charred Village") - 6:49

Chart performance

Muanpiällinen helevetti reached the #7 spot at its peak on the Finnish Albums Top 40 charts and was there for two weeks.

References

2006 debut albums
Verjnuarmu albums